Togbui Adzongaga Amenya Fiti V is the paramount chief of the Aflao Traditional Area in the Volta Region of Ghana.

References 

Living people
Ghanaian leaders
Year of birth missing (living people)